Halla (16 May 1945 – 19 May 1979) was a horse ridden by Hans Günter Winkler. She is the only horse ever to win three Olympic Gold medals in the sport of show jumping.

Halla (also listed as "Sonnenglanz") was born in the yard of Gustav Vierling in Darmstadt. Her parents were Helene, a French trotter horse of unknown breeding, and the Standardbred Oberst. Halla was first trained as a steeplechaser before she was discovered by the German Olympic committee. She was to be used in eventing competitions, but was considered very difficult and changed riders several times. Despite her great talent, she remained unsuccessful. In 1951 she was taken over by the then rising star Hans Günter Winkler.

Halla had already won back-to-back World Championships in show jumping when she and Winkler competed at the 1956 Olympics in Stockholm. During the first round, Halla took off early for the penultimate fence. Winkler was thrown into the air, landed heavily back in the saddle and tore a groin muscle. He knew that if he withdrew from the final round, the German team would be eliminated. In great pain, he rode anyway, only being able to give the slightest direction to his mount. Halla completed the course without a fault, and they earned gold in both the individual and team events.

Four years later, at the 1960 Olympics in Rome, Halla and Winkler led the German team to another victory.

Together they won a total of 125 jumping competitions. Thus Halla stands as the horse with most gold medals from the Olympic Games in The Guinness Book of the Records.

Halla retired from the sport on 25 October 1960 to begin her career as a broodmare.  She had eight foals but none was a champion like herself.

Halla died on 19 May 1979 at the advanced age of 34 years.

Pedigree

Major achievements

Winner Individual Gold Medal 1956 Olympics in Stockholm    
Winner Team Gold Medal 1956 Olympics in Stockholm
Winner Team Gold Medal 1960 Olympics in Rome    
Winner 1954 World Championships in Madrid
Winner 1955 World Championships in Aachen
Individual Bronze Medal 1958 European Championships in Aachen

International Grand Prix  Wins include:

1957 Aachen (CHIO) Grand Prix
1958 Wiesbaden Grand Prix
1959 Rome (CSIO) Grand Prix
Winner 1955 Hamburg Derby

References

 1956 Olympics in Stockholm
 Stoneridge, M. A. Great Horses of Our Time New York: Doubleday 1972
 Bryant, Jennifer O. Olympic Equestrian, A Century of International Horse Sport. Lexington, KY: Blood-Horse Publications, 2008

External links
Photo of Halla at 1956 Olympic Games
Photo of Halla at the 1959 Hamburg Derby



Show jumping horses
Individual mares
Horses in the Olympics
1945 animal births
1979 animal deaths